Nathan Grafton (1826 – July 24, 1915) was an American politician and manufacturer from Maryland. He served as a member of the Maryland House of Delegates, representing Harford County in 1874.

Early life
Nathan Grafton was born near Forest Hill, Maryland, in 1826. His brother William was a pastor at the Old Style Baptist Church.

Career
Grafton started a trade as a wheelwright and carriage builder. He had a carriage factory. He retired around 1890 and turned the business over to his sons.

Grafton was a Democrat. He served as a member of the Maryland House of Delegates, representing Harford County in 1874.

Grafton was one of the first directors of the Harford Fair Association in the 1870s. He was an original charter member of the Harford National Bank and served as a trustee of the Forest Hill School.

Personal life
Grafton married Barbara Hartman, aunt of state's attorney George Hartman. Grafton had one daughter and three sons, Mary, Jacob, Durand and William. Grafton was a member of the Old Style Baptist Church.

Grafton died on July 24, 1915, at his home near Forest Hill. He was buried at the Old Baptist Cemetery in Jarrettsville.

References

1826 births
1915 deaths
People from Harford County, Maryland
Democratic Party members of the Maryland House of Delegates
Baptists from Maryland